St Giles’ Church, Normantion, Derby is a locally listed parish church in the Church of England in Normanton, Derby.

History

The present building replaced a medieval chapel. The church dates from 1861 and was built to the designs of the architects Giles and Brookhouse by the contractors William Bridgart (son of George and Mary Bridgart) and Charles Whiting Bridgart (son of Robert Bridgart snr. and Hannah Bridgart) of Derby. William and Charles were first cousins. It opened for worship on 13 May 1862. It was consecrated on 23 September 1863.

It was enlarged in 1902. Work started on 15 November 1902 when a foundation stone was laid by Fitzherbert Wright, the High Sheriff of Derbyshire.  It was substantially reordered and underfloor heating installed in 2010.

Present day
St Giles' Church is within the Conservative Evangelical tradition of the Church of England, and it has passed resolutions to reject the ordination of women.

Organ

The church contains an organ by  Peter Conacher. A specification of the organ can be found on the National Pipe Organ Register.

Organists
Fred Morley 1943 - ???? (formerly organist of St Andrew's Church, Derby)

References

See also

Church of England church buildings in Derbyshire
Churches completed in 1862
Churches in Derby
1862 establishments in England
Normanton